Cocoa damselfish may refer to two different species of fish, formerly considered as conspecific:
 Brazilian cocoa damselfish (Stegastes variabilis), a species of fish found in the western Atlantic off Brazil
 Caribbean cocoa damselfish (Stegastes xanthurus), a species of fish found in the Caribbean